Orion (officially Orion Multi-Purpose Crew Vehicle or Orion MPCV) is a partially reusable crewed spacecraft used in NASA's Artemis program. The spacecraft consists of a Crew Module (CM) space capsule designed by Lockheed Martin and the European Service Module (ESM) manufactured by Airbus Defence and Space. Capable of supporting a crew of six beyond low Earth orbit, Orion can last up to 21 days undocked and up to six months docked. It is equipped with solar panels, an automated docking system, and glass cockpit interfaces modeled after those used in the Boeing 787 Dreamliner. A single AJ10 engine provides the spacecraft's primary propulsion, while eight R-4D-11 engines, and six pods of custom reaction control system engines developed by Airbus, provide the spacecraft's secondary propulsion. Although compatible with other launch vehicles, Orion is primarily intended to launch atop a Space Launch System (SLS) rocket, with a tower launch escape system.

Orion was originally conceived in the early 2000s by Lockheed Martin as a proposal for the Crew Exploration Vehicle (CEV) to be used in NASA's Constellation program. Lockheed Martin's proposal defeated a competing proposal by Northrop Grumman and was selected by NASA in 2006 to be the CEV. Originally designed with a service module featuring a new "Orion Main Engine" and a pair of circular solar panels, the spacecraft was to be launched atop the Ares I rocket. Following the cancellation of the Constellation program in 2010, Orion was heavily redesigned for use in NASA's Journey to Mars initiative; later named Moon to Mars. The SLS replaced the Ares I as Orion's primary launch vehicle, and the service module was replaced with a design based on the European Space Agency's Automated Transfer Vehicle. A development version of Orion's CM was launched in 2014 during Exploration Flight Test-1, while at least four test articles have been produced. Orion was primarily designed by Lockheed Martin Space Systems in Littleton, Colorado. , three flight-worthy Orion spacecraft are under construction, with one completed and an additional one ordered, for use in NASA's Artemis program.

The first completed unit, CM-002, was launched on November 16, 2022 on Artemis 1.

Spacecraft description

Orion uses the same basic configuration as the Apollo command and service module (CSM) that first took astronauts to the Moon, but with an increased diameter, updated thermal protection system, and other modern technologies. It will be capable of supporting long-duration deep space missions with up to 21 days of active crew time plus 6 months' quiescent spacecraft life. During the quiescent period crew life support would be provided by another module, such as the proposed Deep Space Habitat. The spacecraft's life support, propulsion, thermal protection, and avionics systems can be upgraded as new technologies become available.

The Orion spacecraft includes both crew and service modules, a spacecraft adapter and an emergency launch abort system. The Orion crew module is larger than Apollo's and can support more crew members for short or long-duration missions. The European service module propels and powers the spacecraft as well as storing oxygen and water for astronauts, Orion relies on solar energy rather than fuel cells, which allows for longer missions.

Crew module (CM) 

The Orion crew module (CM) is a reusable transportation capsule that provides a habitat for the crew, provides storage for consumables and research instruments, and contains the docking port for crew transfers. It was manufactured by the Lockheed Martin Corporation at Michoud Assembly Facility in New Orleans. It has 50% more volume than the Apollo capsule and will carry four to six astronauts. After extensive study, NASA selected the Avcoat ablator system to provide heat protection encountered during reentry for the Orion crew module. Avcoat, which is composed of silica fibers with a resin in a honeycomb made of fiberglass and phenolic resin, was formerly used on the Apollo missions and on the Space Shuttle orbiter for early flights.

Orion's CM uses advanced technologies, including:

 Glass cockpit digital control systems derived from those of the Boeing 787.
 An "autodock" feature, like those of Progress, the Automated Transfer Vehicle, and Dragon 2, with provision for the flight crew to take over in an emergency. Prior US spacecraft have all been docked by the crew, with the exception of Dragon 2.
 Improved waste-management facilities, with a miniature camping-style toilet and the unisex "relief tube" used on the Space Shuttle.
 A nitrogen/oxygen (/) mixed atmosphere at either sea level or reduced pressure.

The CM is built of aluminium-lithium alloy. The reusable recovery parachutes are based on the parachutes used on both the Apollo spacecraft and the Space Shuttle Solid Rocket Boosters, and constructed of Nomex cloth. Water landing is the exclusive means of recovery for the Orion CM.

To allow Orion to mate with other vehicles, it will be equipped with the NASA Docking System. The spacecraft employs a Launch Abort System (LAS) along with a "Boost Protective Cover" (made of fiberglass), to protect the Orion CM from aerodynamic and impact stresses during the first  minutes of ascent. Orion is designed to be 10 times safer during ascent and reentry than the Space Shuttle. The CM is designed to be refurbished and reused. In addition, all of Orion's component parts have been designed to be as modular as possible, so that between the craft's first test flight in 2014 and its projected Mars voyage in the 2030s, the spacecraft can be upgraded as new technologies become available.

As of 2019, the Spacecraft Atmospheric Monitor is planned to be used in the Orion CM.

European Service Module (ESM)

In May 2011 the ESA director general announced a possible collaboration with NASA to work on a successor to the Automated Transfer Vehicle (ATV). On June 21, 2012, Airbus Defence and Space announced that they had been awarded two separate studies, each worth €6.5 million, to evaluate the possibilities of using technology and experience gained from ATV and Columbus related work for future missions. The first looked into the possible construction of a service module which would be used in tandem with the Orion CM. The second examined the possible production of a versatile multi purpose orbital vehicle.

On November 21, 2012, the ESA decided to develop an ATV-derived service module for Orion. The service module is being manufactured by Airbus Defence and Space in Bremen, Germany. NASA announced on January 16, 2013, that the ESA service module will first fly on Artemis 1, the debut launch of the Space Launch System.

Testing of the European service module began in February 2016, at the Space Power Facility.

On February 16, 2017, a €200m contract was signed between Airbus and the European Space Agency for the production of a second European service module for use on the first crewed Orion flight, Artemis 2.

On October 26, 2018 the first unit for Artemis 1 was assembled in full at Airbus Defence and Space's factory in Bremen, Germany.

Launch Abort System (LAS) 

In the event of an emergency on the launch pad or during ascent, the Launch Abort System (LAS) will separate the crew module from the launch vehicle using three solid rocket motors: an abort motor (AM), an attitude control motor (ACM), and a jettison motor (JM). The AM provides the thrust needed to accelerate the capsule, while the ACM is used to point the AM and the jettison motor separates the LAS from the crew capsule. On July 10, 2007, Orbital Sciences, the prime contractor for the LAS, awarded Alliant Techsystems (ATK) a $62.5 million sub-contract to "design, develop, produce, test and deliver the launch abort motor," which uses a "reverse flow" design. On July 9, 2008, NASA announced that ATK had completed construction of a vertical test stand at a facility in Promontory, Utah to test launch abort motors for the Orion spacecraft. Another long-time space motor contractor, Aerojet, was awarded the jettison motor design and development contract for the LAS. As of September 2008, Aerojet has, along with team members Orbital Sciences, Lockheed Martin and NASA, successfully demonstrated two full-scale test firings of the jettison motor. This motor is used on every flight, as it separates the LAS from the vehicle after both a successful launch and a launch abort.

History 

The Orion MPCV was announced by NASA on May 24, 2011. Its design is based on the Crew Exploration Vehicle from the canceled Constellation program, which had been a 2006 NASA contract award to Lockheed Martin. The command module is being built by Lockheed Martin at the Michoud Assembly Facility, while the Orion service module is being built by Airbus Defence and Space in Bremen with funding from the European Space Agency. The MPCV's first uncrewed test flight (EFT-1) was launched atop a Delta IV Heavy rocket on December 5, 2014, and lasted 4 hours and 24 minutes before landing at its target in the Pacific Ocean.

On November 30, 2020, it was reported that NASA and Lockheed Martin had found a failure with a component in one of the Orion spacecraft's power data units but NASA later clarified that it does not expect the issue to affect the Artemis 1 launch date.

 Funding history and planning 

For fiscal years 2006 through 2022, the Orion program had expended funding totaling $21.5 billion in nominal dollars. This is equivalent to $26.3 billion in 2022 dollars using the NASA New Start Inflation Indices.

For fiscal year 2023, the current administration is requesting $1,339 million for the Orion program.

Excluded from the prior Orion costs are:

 Most costs "for production, operations, or sustainment of additional crew capsules, despite plans to use and possibly enhance this capsule after 2021"; production and operations contracts were awarded going into fiscal year 2020
 Costs of the first service module and spare parts, which are provided by ESA for the test flight of Orion (about US$1 billion)
 Costs to assemble, integrate, prepare and launch the Orion and its launcher, funded separately in the NASA Ground Operations Project, currently about $600M per year
 Costs of the launcher, the SLS, for the Orion spacecraft

For 2021 to 2025, NASA estimates yearly budgets for Orion from $1.4 to $1.1 billion. In late 2015, the Orion program was assessed at a 70% confidence level for its first crewed flight by 2023.

There are no NASA estimates for the Orion program recurring yearly costs once operational, for a certain flight rate per year, or for the resulting average costs per flight. However, a production and operations contract awarded to Lockheed Martin in 2019 indicated NASA will pay the prime contractor $900M for the first three Orion capsules and $633M for the following three. In 2016, the NASA manager of exploration systems development said that Orion, SLS, and supporting ground systems should cost "US$2 billion or less" annually. NASA will not provide the cost per flight of Orion and SLS, with associate administrator William H. Gerstenmaier stating "costs must be derived from the data and are not directly available. This was done by design to lower NASA's expenditures" in 2017.

Ground test articles, mockups, and boilerplates

 Space Vehicle Mockup Facility (SVMF) in Johnson Space Center, includes a full-scale Orion capsule mock-up for astronaut training.
 MLAS An Orion boilerplate was used in the MLAS test launch.
 Ares-I-X The Orion Mass Simulator was used on the Ares I-X flight test.
 Pad Abort 1 An Orion boilerplate was used for the Pad Abort 1 flight test, the LAS was fully functional, the boilerplate was recovered
 Ascent Abort-2 An Orion boilerplate was used for the Ascent Abort 2 flight test, the LAS was fully functional, the boilerplate was discarded 
 The Boilerplate Test Article (BTA) underwent splashdown testing at the Langley Research Center.  This same test article has been modified to support Orion Recovery Testing in stationary and underway recovery tests. The BTA contains over 150 sensors to gather data on its test drops. Testing of the  mockup ran from July 2011 to January 6, 2012.
 The Ground Test Article (GTA) stack, located at Lockheed Martin in Denver, is undergoing vibration testing. It is made up by the Orion Ground Test Vehicle (GTV) combined with its Launch Abort System (LAS). Further testing will see the addition of service module simulator panels and Thermal Protection System (TPS) to the GTA stack.
Testing began in 2007. Testing of the staged parachutes includes the partial opening and complete failure of one of the three main parachutes. The drop test program has had several failures in 2007, 2008, and 2010, resulting in new DTV being constructed. The landing parachute set is known as the Capsule Parachute Assembly System (CPAS). A third test vehicle, the PCDTV3, was successfully tested in a drop on April 17, 2012.

 Variants 
 Orion Crew Exploration Vehicle (CEV) 

The idea for a Crew Exploration Vehicle (CEV) was announced on January 14, 2004, as part of the Vision for Space Exploration after the Space Shuttle Columbia accident. The CEV effectively replaced the conceptual Orbital Space Plane (OSP), a proposed replacement for the Space Shuttle. A design competition was held, and the winner was the proposal from a consortium led by Lockheed Martin. It was later named "Orion" after the stellar constellation and mythical hunter of the same name, and became part of the Constellation program under NASA administrator Sean O'Keefe.

Constellation proposed using the Orion CEV in both crew and cargo variants to support the International Space Station and as a crew vehicle for a return to the Moon. The crew/command module was originally intended to land on solid ground on the US west coast using airbags but later changed to ocean splashdown, while a service module was included for life support and propulsion. The service module was originally planned to use liquid methane (LCH4) as its fuel, but switched to hypergolic propellants due to the infancy of oxygen/methane-powered rocket technologies and the goal of launching the Orion CEV by 2012.

The Orion CEV was to be launched on the Ares I rocket to low Earth orbit, where it would rendezvous with the Altair lunar lander launched on a heavy-lift Ares V launch vehicle for lunar missions.

Environmental testing
NASA performed environmental testing of Orion from 2007 to 2011 at the Glenn Research Center Plum Brook Station in Sandusky, Ohio. The Center's Space Power Facility is the world's largest thermal vacuum chamber.

Launch Abort System (LAS) testing

ATK Aerospace successfully completed the first Orion Launch Abort System (LAS) test on November 20, 2008. The LAS motor could provide  of thrust in case an emergency situation should arise on the launch pad or during the first  of the rocket's climb to orbit.

On March 2, 2009, a full size, full weight command module mockup (pathfinder) began its journey from the Langley Research Center to the White Sands Missile Range, New Mexico, for at-gantry launch vehicle assembly training and for LES testing. The test used three solid-fuel rocket motorsthe main thrust motor, an attitude control motor and the jettison motor.

Splashdown recovery testing
In 2009, during the Constellation phase of the program, the Post-landing Orion Recovery Test (PORT) was designed to determine and evaluate methods of crew rescue and what kind of motions the astronaut crew could expect after landing, including conditions outside the capsule for the recovery team. The evaluation process supported NASA's design of landing recovery operations including equipment, ship and crew needs.

The PORT Test used a full-scale boilerplate  (mock-up) of NASA's Orion crew module and was tested in water under simulated and real weather conditions. Tests began March 23, 2009, with a Navy-built,  boilerplate in a test pool. Full sea testing ran April 6–30, 2009, at various locations off the coast of NASA's Kennedy Space Center with media coverage.

Cancellation of Constellation program

On May 7, 2009, the Obama administration enlisted the Augustine Commission to perform a full independent review of the ongoing NASA space exploration program.  The commission found the then-current Constellation Program to be woefully under-budgeted with significant cost overruns, behind schedule by four years or more in several essential components, and unlikely to be capable of meeting any of its scheduled goals.NASA in Obama's Hands  Information Addict Website, by Nathaniel Downes.  Published 18 June 2012.  Retrieved 14 Dec 2014  As a consequence, the commission recommended a significant re-allocation of goals and resources.  As one of the many outcomes based on these recommendations, on October 11, 2010, the Constellation program was canceled, ending development of the Altair, Ares I, and Ares V. The Orion Crew Exploration Vehicle survived the cancellation and was transferred to be launched on the Space Launch System.

 Orion Multi-Purpose Crew Vehicle (MPCV) 
The Orion development program was restructured from three different versions of the Orion capsule, each for a different task, to the development of the MPCV as a single version capable of performing multiple tasks. On December 5, 2014, a developmental Orion spacecraft was successfully launched into space and retrieved at sea after splashdown on the Exploration Flight Test-1 (EFT-1).

Orion splashdown recovery testing
Before EFT-1 in December 2014, several preparatory vehicle recovery tests were performed, which continued the "crawl, walk, run" approach established by PORT. The "crawl" phase was performed August 12–16, 2013, with the Stationary Recovery Test (SRT).  The Stationary Recovery Test demonstrated the recovery hardware and techniques that were to be employed for the recovery of the Orion crew module in the protected waters of Naval Station Norfolk utilizing the LPD-17 type USS Arlington as the recovery ship.

The "walk" and "run" phases were performed with the Underway Recovery Test (URT). Also utilizing an LPD 17 class ship, the URT was performed in more realistic sea conditions off the coast of California in early 2014 to prepare the US Navy / NASA team for recovering the Exploration Flight Test-1 (EFT-1) Orion crew module. The URT tests completed the pre-launch test phase of the Orion recovery system.

 Orion Lite 
History
Orion Lite is an unofficial name used in the media for a lightweight crew capsule proposed by Bigelow Aerospace in collaboration with Lockheed Martin. It was to be based on the Orion spacecraft that Lockheed Martin was developing for NASA. It would be a lighter, less capable and cheaper version of the full Orion.

The intention of designing Orion Lite would be to provide a stripped-down version of the Orion that would be available for missions to the International Space Station earlier than the more capable Orion, which is designed for longer duration missions to the Moon and Mars.

Bigelow had begun working with Lockheed Martin in 2004. A few years later Bigelow signed a million-dollar contract to develop "an Orion mockup, an Orion Lite", in 2009.

The proposed collaboration between Bigelow and Lockheed Martin on the Orion Lite spacecraft has ended. Bigelow began work with Boeing on a similar capsule, the CST-100, which has no Orion heritage, and was selected under NASA's Commercial Crew Development (CCDev) program to transport crew to the ISS.

 Design 

Orion Lite's primary mission would be to transport crew to the International Space Station, or to private space stations such as the planned B330 from Bigelow Aerospace. While Orion Lite would have the same exterior dimensions as the Orion, there would be no need for the deep space infrastructure present in the Orion configuration. As such, the Orion Lite would be able to support larger crews of around 7 people as the result of greater habitable interior volume and the reduced weight of equipment needed to support an exclusively low-Earth-orbit configuration.

Recovery

In order to reduce the weight of Orion Lite, the more durable heat shield of the Orion would be replaced with a lighter weight heat shield designed to support the lower temperatures of Earth atmospheric re-entry from low Earth orbit. Additionally, the current proposal calls for a mid-air retrieval, wherein another aircraft captures the descending Orion Lite module. To date, such a retrieval method has not been employed for crewed spacecraft, although it has been used with satellites.

 Flights 
List of flights

 Upcoming missions 

The first crewed flight, Artemis 2, will be a lunar flyby. Flights are expected to achieve a yearly cadence from Artemis 4 onward in 2028.

 Proposed 
A proposal curated by William H. Gerstenmaier before his 10 July 2019 reassignment suggests four launches of the crewed Orion spacecraft and logistical modules aboard the SLS Block 1B to the Gateway between 2024 and 2028. The crewed Artemis4 through7 would launch yearly between 2025 and 2028, testing in situ resource utilization and nuclear power on the lunar surface with a partially reusable lander. Artemis7 would deliver in 2028 a crew of four astronauts to a surface lunar outpost known as the Lunar Surface Asset.  The Lunar Surface Asset would be launched by an undetermined launcher and would be used for extended crewed lunar surface missions. Another repair mission to the Hubble Space Telescope is also possible.

 Potential Mars missions 

The Orion capsule is designed to support future missions to send astronauts to Mars, probably to take place in the 2030s. The complete spacecraft stack is known as the Deep Space Transport. The habitat module will provide additional space and supplies, as well as facilitate spacecraft maintenance, mission communications, exercise, training, and personal recreation. DSH sizes and configurations may vary slightly, depending on crew and mission needs. The mission may launch in the mid-2030s or late-2030s.

Canceled
 Asteroid Redirect Mission

The Asteroid Redirect Mission (ARM), also known as the Asteroid Retrieval and Utilization (ARU) mission and the Asteroid Initiative, was a space mission proposed by NASA in 2013. The Asteroid Retrieval Robotic Mission (ARRM) spacecraft would rendezvous with a large near-Earth asteroid and use robotic arms with anchoring grippers to retrieve a 4-meter boulder from the asteroid. A secondary objective was to develop the required technology to bring a small near-Earth asteroid into lunar orbit – "the asteroid was a bonus." There, it could be analyzed by the crew of the Orion EM-5 or EM-6 ARCM mission in 2026.

List of vehicles

 See also 

 
 
 

 References 

 External links 

AA-2 Orion Launch video
 
ESA Photo Gallery
Mission concept for combined Orion/Sample return

 
Crewed spacecraft
Proposed spacecraft
Deep Space Habitat
Artemis program
Articles containing video clips
Vehicles introduced in 2014
Reusable spacecraft
Lunar Gateway
NASA spacecraft
By May 2020, the ESA had signed an agreement with NASA to provide three service modules for Artemis as part of its barter arrangement with NASA to be a member of the Artemis program.  The ESMs cost approximately  each to acquire from Airbus, not counting the costs incurred by the ESA directly.  The third ESM is slated to fly in 2024.